Benjamin David Goodman (May 30, 1909 – June 13, 1986) was an American clarinetist and bandleader known as the "King of Swing".

From 1936 until the mid-1940s, Goodman led one of the most popular swing big bands in the United States. His concert at Carnegie Hall in New York City on January 16, 1938, is described by critic Bruce Eder as "the single most important jazz or popular music concert in history: jazz's 'coming out' party to the world of 'respectable' music."

Goodman's bands started the careers of many jazz musicians. During an era of racial segregation, he led one of the first integrated jazz groups, his trio and quartet. He performed nearly to the end of his life while exploring an interest in classical music.

Early years 

Goodman was the ninth of twelve children born to poor Jewish emigrants from the Russian Empire. His father, David Goodman (1873–1926), came to the United States in 1892 from Warsaw in partitioned Poland and became a tailor. His mother, Dora Grisinsky, (1873–1964), came from Kaunas. They met in Baltimore, Maryland, and moved to Chicago before Goodman's birth. With little income and a large family, they moved to the Maxwell Street neighborhood, an overcrowded slum near railroad yards and factories that was populated by German, Irish, Italian, Polish, Scandinavian, and Jewish immigrants.

Money was a constant problem. On Sundays, his father took the children to free band concerts in Douglass Park, which was the first time Goodman experienced live professional performances. To give his children some skills and an appreciation for music, his father enrolled ten-year-old Goodman and two of his brothers in music lessons, from 1919, at the Kehelah Jacob Synagogue. Benny also received two years of instruction from the classically trained clarinetist and Chicago Symphony member, Franz Schoepp. During the next year Goodman joined the boys club band at Hull House, where he received lessons from director James Sylvester. By joining the band, he was entitled to spend two weeks at a summer camp near Chicago. It was the only time he could get away from his bleak neighborhood. At 13, he got his first union card. He performed on Lake Michigan excursion boats, and in 1923 played at Guyon's Paradise, a local dance hall.

In the summer of 1923, he met Bix Beiderbecke. He attended the Lewis Institute (Illinois Institute of Technology) in 1924 as a high-school sophomore and played clarinet in a dance hall band. When he was 17, his father was killed by a passing car after stepping off a streetcar. His father's death was "the saddest thing that ever happened in our family", Goodman said.

Career

Early career
His early influences were New Orleans jazz clarinetists who worked in Chicago, such as Jimmie Noone, Johnny Dodds, and Leon Roppolo. He learned quickly, becoming a strong player at an early age, and was soon playing in bands. He made his professional debut in 1921 at the Central Park Theater on the West Side of Chicago. He entered Harrison Technical High School in Chicago in 1922. At fourteen he became a member of the musicians' union and worked in a band featuring Bix Beiderbecke. Two years later he joined the Ben Pollack Orchestra and made his first recordings in 1926.

From sideman to bandleader
Goodman moved to New York City and became a session musician for radio, Broadway musicals, and in studios. In addition to clarinet, he sometimes played alto saxophone and baritone saxophone. His first recording pressed to disc (Victor 20394) occurred on December 9, 1926, in Chicago. The session resulted in the song "When I First Met Mary", which also included Glenn Miller, Harry Goodman, and Ben Pollack. In a Victor recording session on March 21, 1928, he played alongside Glenn Miller, Tommy Dorsey, and Joe Venuti in the All-Star Orchestra directed by Nathaniel Shilkret. He played with the bands of  Red Nichols, Ben Selvin, Ted Lewis, and Isham Jones and recorded for Brunswick under the name Benny Goodman's Boys, a band that featured Glenn Miller. In 1928, Goodman and Miller wrote "Room 1411", which was released as a Brunswick 78.

He reached the charts for the first time when he recorded "He's Not Worth Your Tears" with a vocal by Scrappy Lambert for Melotone. After signing with Columbia in 1934, he had top ten hits with "Ain't Cha Glad?" and "I Ain't Lazy, I'm Just Dreamin'" sung by Jack Teagarden, "Ol' Pappy" sung by Mildred Bailey, and "Riffin' the Scotch" sung by Billie Holiday. An invitation to play at the Billy Rose Music Hall led to his creation of an orchestra for the four-month engagement. The orchestra recorded "Moonglow", which became a number one hit and was followed by the Top Ten hits "Take My Word" and "Bugle Call Rag".

NBC hired Goodman for the radio program Let's Dance. John Hammond asked Fletcher Henderson if he wanted to write arrangements for Goodman, and Henderson agreed. During the Depression, Henderson disbanded his orchestra because he was in debt. Goodman hired Henderson's band members to teach his musicians how to play the music.

Goodman's band was one of three to perform on Let's Dance, playing arrangements by Henderson along with hits such as "Get Happy" and "Limehouse Blues" by Spud Murphy.

Goodman's portion of the program was broadcast too late at night to attract a large audience on the east coast. He and his band remained on Let's Dance until May of that year when a strike by employees of the series' sponsor, Nabisco, forced the cancellation of the radio show. An engagement was booked at Manhattan's Roosevelt Grill filling in for Guy Lombardo, but the audience expected "sweet" music and Goodman's band was unsuccessful.

Goodman spent six months performing on Let's Dance, and during that time he recorded six more Top Ten hits for Columbia.

Catalyst for the swing era

On July 31, 1935, "King Porter Stomp" was released with "Sometimes I'm Happy" on the B-side, both arranged by Henderson and recorded on July 1. In Pittsburgh at the Stanley Theater some members of the audience danced in the aisles. But these arrangements had little impact on the tour until August 19 at McFadden's Ballroom in Oakland, California. Goodman and his band, which included Bunny Berigan, drummer Gene Krupa, and singer  Helen Ward were met by a large crowd of young dancers who cheered the music they had heard on Let's Dance. Herb Caen wrote, "from the first note, the place was in an uproar." One night later, at Pismo Beach, the show was a flop, and the band thought the overwhelming reception in Oakland had been a fluke. 

The next night, August 21, 1935, at the Palomar Ballroom in Los Angeles, Goodman and his band began a three-week engagement. On top of the Let's Dance airplay, Al Jarvis had been playing Goodman's records on KFWB radio. Goodman started the evening with stock arrangements, but after an indifferent response, he began the second set with arrangements by Fletcher Henderson and Spud Murphy. According to Willard Alexander, the band's booking agent, Krupa said, "If we're gonna die, Benny, let's die playing our own thing." The crowd broke into cheers and applause. News reports spread word of the exciting music and enthusiastic dancing. The Palomar engagement was such a marked success that it is often described as the beginning of the swing era. According to Donald Clarke, "It is clear in retrospect that the Swing Era  had been waiting to happen, but it was Goodman and his band that touched it off."

The reception of American swing was less enthusiastic in Europe. British author J. C. Squire filed a complaint with BBC radio to demand it stop playing Goodman's music, which he called "an awful series of jungle noises which can hearten no man." Germany's Nazi party barred jazz from the radio, claiming it was part of a Jewish conspiracy to destroy the culture. Italy's fascist government banned the broadcast of any music composed or played by Jews which they said threatened "the flower of our race, the youth."

In November 1935 Goodman accepted an invitation to play in Chicago at the Joseph Urban Room at the Congress Hotel. His stay there extended to six months, and his popularity was cemented by nationwide radio broadcasts over NBC affiliate stations. While in Chicago, the band recorded If I Could Be with You, Stompin' at the Savoy, and Goody, Goody. Goodman also played three concerts produced by Chicago socialite and jazz aficionado Helen Oakley. These "Rhythm Club" concerts at the Congress Hotel included sets in which Goodman and Krupa sat in with Fletcher Henderson's band, perhaps the first racially integrated big band appearing before a paying audience in the United States. Goodman and Krupa played in a trio with Teddy Wilson on piano. Both combinations were well received, and Wilson remained.

In his 1935–1936 radio broadcasts from Chicago, Goodman was introduced as the "Rajah of Rhythm". Slingerland Drum Company had been calling Krupa the "King of Swing" as part of a sales campaign, but shortly after Goodman and his crew left Chicago in May 1936 to spend the summer filming The Big Broadcast of 1937 in Hollywood, the title "King of Swing" was applied to Goodman by the media.

At the end of June 1936, Goodman went to Hollywood, where, on June 30, 1936, his band began CBS's Camel Caravan, its third and (according to Connor and Hicks) its greatest sponsored radio show, co-starring Goodman and his former boss Nathaniel Shilkret. By spring 1936, Fletcher Henderson was writing arrangements for Goodman's band.

Carnegie Hall concert 

In late 1937, Goodman's publicist Wynn Nathanson suggested that Goodman and his band play Carnegie Hall in New York City. The sold-out concert was held on the evening of January 16, 1938. It is regarded as one of the most significant in jazz history. After years of work by musicians from all over the country, jazz had finally been accepted by mainstream audiences. Recordings of the concert were made, but even by the technology of the day the equipment used was not of the finest quality. Acetate recordings of the concert were made, and aluminum studio masters were cut. "The recording was produced by Albert Marx as a special gift for his wife, Helen Ward, and a second set for Benny. He contracted Artists Recording Studio to make two sets. Artists Recording only had two turntables so they farmed out the second set to Raymond Scott's recording studio....It was Benny's sister-in-law who found the recordings in Benny's apartment [in 1950] and brought them to Benny's attention." Goodman took the discovered recording to Columbia, and a selection was issued on LP as The Famous 1938 Carnegie Hall Jazz Concert.

Charlie Christian 
Pianist and arranger Mary Lou Williams suggested to Hammond that he see guitarist Charlie Christian. Hammond had seen Christian perform in Oklahoma City in 1939 and recommended him to Goodman, but Goodman was uninterested in electric guitar and was put off by Christian's taste in gaudy clothing. During a break at a concert in Beverly Hills, Hammond inserted Christian into the band. Goodman started playing "Rose Room" on the assumption that Christian didn't know it, but his performance impressed everyone. Christian was a member of the Benny Goodman Sextet from 1939 to 1941, and during these two years he turned the electric guitar into a popular jazz instrument.

Decline of swing

Goodman continued his success throughout the late 1930s with his big band, his trio and quartet, and the sextet formed in August 1939, the same month Goodman returned to Columbia Records after four years with RCA Victor. At Columbia, John Hammond, his future brother-in-law, produced most of his sessions. By the mid-1940s, however, big bands had lost much of their popularity. In 1941, ASCAP had a licensing war with music publishers. From 1942 to 1944 and again in 1948, the musicians' union went on strike against the major record labels in the United States, and singers acquired the popularity that the big bands had once enjoyed. During the 1942–44 strike, the War Department approached the union and requested the production of V-Discs, a set of records containing new recordings for soldiers to listen to, thereby boosting the rise of new artists Also, by the late 1940s, swing was no longer the dominant style of jazz musicians.

Exploring bebop 

By the 1940s, some jazz musicians were borrowing from classical music, while others, such as Charlie Parker, were broadening the rhythmic, harmonic, and melodic vocabulary of swing to create bebop (or bop). The bebop recordings Goodman made for Capitol were praised by critics. For his bebop band he hired Buddy Greco, Zoot Sims, and Wardell Gray. He consulted his friend Mary Lou Williams for advice on how to approach the music of Dizzy Gillespie and Charlie Parker. Pianist Mel Powell was also an adviser in 1945. Goodman enjoyed bebop. When he heard Thelonious Monk, he said, "I like it, I like that very much. I like the piece and I like the way he played it ... I think he's got a sense of humor and he's got some good things there." He also admired Swedish clarinetist Stan Hasselgård. But after playing with a bebop band for over a year, he returned to his swing band because he concluded that was what he knew best. In 1953, he said, "Maybe bop has done more to set music back for years than anything ... Basically it's all wrong. It's not even knowing the scales ... Bop was mostly publicity and people figuring angles."

Classical repertoire 
In 1949 he studied with clarinetist Reginald Kell, requiring a change in technique: "instead of holding the mouthpiece between his front teeth and lower lip, as he had done since he first took a clarinet in hand 30 years earlier, Goodman learned to adjust his embouchure to the use of both lips and even to use new fingering techniques. He had his old finger calluses removed and started to learn how to play his clarinet again—almost from scratch."

Goodman commissioned compositions for clarinet and chamber ensembles or orchestra that have become standard pieces of classical repertoire. He premiered works by composers, such as Contrasts by Béla Bartók; Clarinet Concerto No. 2, Op. 115 by Malcolm Arnold; Derivations for Clarinet and Band by Morton Gould; Sonata for Clarinet and Piano by Francis Poulenc, and Clarinet Concerto by Aaron Copland. Prelude, Fugue, and Riffs by Leonard Bernstein was commissioned for Woody Herman's big band, but it was premiered by Goodman. Herman was the dedicatee (1945) and first performer (1946) of Igor Stravinsky's Ebony Concerto, but many years later Stravinsky made another recording with Goodman as the soloist.

He made a recording of Mozart's Clarinet Quintet in July 1956 with the Boston Symphony String Quartet at the Berkshire Festival; on the same occasion he recorded Mozart's Clarinet Concerto in A major, K. 622, with the Boston Symphony Orchestra conducted by Charles Munch. He also recorded the clarinet concertos of Weber

After forays outside swing, Goodman started a new band in 1953. According to Donald Clarke, this was not a happy time for Goodman. He reunited the band to tour with Louis Armstrong. But he insulted Armstrong and "was appalled at the vaudeville aspects of Louis's act...a contradiction of everything Goodman stood for". Armstrong left Goodman hanging during a joint performance where Goodman called Armstrong back onstage to wrap up the show. Armstrong refused to perform alongside Goodman, which led essentially to the end of their friendship.

Goodman's band appeared as a specialty act in the films The Big Broadcast of 1937; Hollywood Hotel (1938); Syncopation (1942); The Powers Girl (1942); Stage Door Canteen (1943); The Gang's All Here (1943); Sweet and Low-Down (1944), Goodman's only starring feature; Make Mine Music (1946) and A Song Is Born (1948).

Later years 

He continued to play on records and in small groups. In the early 1970s he collaborated with George Benson after the two met taping a PBS tribute to John Hammond, recreating some of Goodman's  duets with Charlie Christian. Benson appeared on Goodman's album Seven Come Eleven. Goodman continued to play swing, but he practiced and performed classical pieces and commissioned them for clarinet. In 1960 he performed Mozart's Clarinet Concerto with conductor Alfredo Antonini at the Lewisohn Stadium in New York City.  Despite health problems, he continued to perform, his last concert being six days before his death. Goodman died on June 13, 1986, from a heart attack while taking a nap at his apartment in Manhattan House.

Personal life
One of Goodman's closest friends was Columbia producer John Hammond, who influenced Goodman's move from Victor to Columbia. Goodman married Hammond's sister, Alice Frances Hammond Duckworth (1913–1978), on March 20, 1942. They had two daughters and raised Alice's three daughters from her first marriage to British politician Arthur Duckworth. Goodman's daughter Rachel became a classical pianist. She sometimes performed in concert with him, beginning when she was sixteen.

Goodman and Hammond had disagreements from the 1930s onwards. For the 1939 Spirituals to Swing concert Hammond had placed Charlie Christian into the Kansas City Six to play before Goodman's band, which had angered Goodman. They disagreed over the band's music until Goodman refused to listen to Hammond. Their arguments escalated, and in 1941 Hammond left Columbia. Goodman appeared on a 1975 PBS tribute to Hammond but remained at a distance. In the 1980s, after the death of Alice Goodman, Hammond and Goodman reconciled. On June 25, 1985, Goodman appeared at Avery Fisher Hall in New York City for "A Tribute to John Hammond".

Goodman was regarded by some as a demanding taskmaster, by others as an arrogant and eccentric martinet. Many musicians spoke of "The Ray", the glare that Goodman directed at a musician who failed to perform to his standards. After guitarist Allan Reuss incurred Goodman's displeasure, Goodman relegated him to the rear of the bandstand where his contribution would be drowned out by the other musicians. Vocalists Anita O'Day and Helen Forrest spoke bitterly of their experiences singing with Goodman: "The twenty or so months I spent with Benny felt like twenty years," said Forrest. "When I look back, they seem like a life sentence." He was generous and funded several college educations, though always secretly. When a friend asked him why, he said, "Well, if they knew about it, everyone would come to me with their hand out."

Goodman helped racial integration in America. In the early 1930s, black and white musicians could not play together in most clubs and concerts. In the Southern states, racial segregation was enforced by Jim Crow laws. Goodman hired Teddy Wilson for his trio and added vibraphonist Lionel Hampton for his quartet. In 1939 he hired guitarist Charlie Christian. This integration in music happened ten years before Jackie Robinson broke Major League Baseball's six-decade-long color line. According to Jazz (Episode 5) by Ken Burns, Lionel Hampton states that when someone asked Goodman why he "played with that nigger" (referring to Teddy Wilson), Goodman replied, "If you say that again to me, I'll take a clarinet and bust you across your head with it".

In 1962, the Benny Goodman Orchestra toured the Soviet Union as part of a cultural exchange program between the two nations after the Cuban Missile Crisis and the end of that phase of the Cold War; both visits were part of efforts to normalize relations between the United States and the USSR. Members of the band included Jimmy Knepper, Jerry Dodgion, and Turk Van Lake (Vanig Hovsepian). Bassist Bill Crow published a very jaundiced view of the tour and Goodman's conduct during it under the title "To Russia Without Love".

Awards and honors

Goodman was honored with the Grammy Lifetime Achievement Award.

After winning polls as best jazz clarinetist, Goodman was inducted into the Down Beat Jazz Hall of Fame in 1957.

He was a member of the radio division of the National Association of Broadcasters Hall of Fame.

His papers were donated to Yale University after his death. He received honorary doctorates from Union College, the University of Illinois, Southern Illinois University Edwardsville, Bard College,  Brandeis University, Columbia University, Harvard University, and Yale University.

Partial discography 

 Swinging 34 Vols. 1 & 2 (Melodeon, 1934)
 Original Benny Goodman Trio and Quartet Sessions, Vol. 1: After You've Gone (Bluebird, 1935)
 Stomping at the Savoy (Bluebird, 1935)
 Air Play (Doctor Jazz, 1936)
 Sing, Sing, Sing (With a Swing) (Columbia, 1937)
 Roll 'Em, Vol. 1 (Columbia, 1937)
 Roll 'Em, Vol. 2 (Columbia, 1937)
 Don't Be That Way (Columbia 1938)
 From Spirituals to Swing (Vanguard, 1938)
 The Famous 1938 Carnegie Hall Jazz Concert Vols. 1–3 (Columbia, 1938)
 Mozart Clarinet Quintet, with the Budapest String Quartet (RCA Victor, 1938)
 Eddie Sauter Arrangements (Columbia, 1940)
 Swing into Spring (Columbia, 1941)
 Benny Goodman Sextet (Columbia, 1944)
 Undercurrent Blues (Capitol, 1947)
 Swedish Pastry (Dragon, 1948)
 Session for Six (Capitol, 1950)
 The Benny Goodman Trio Plays (Columbia, 1951)
 Goodman & Teagarden (Jazz Panorama, 1951)
 Easy Does It (Capitol, 1952)
 Benny at the Ballroom (Columbia, 1955)
 BG in Hi-Fi (Capitol, 1955)
 Mozart Clarinet Concerto with the Boston Symphony Orchestra (1956)
 Mostly Sextets (Capitol, 1956)
 The Great Benny Goodman (Columbia, 1956)
 Peggy Lee Sings with Benny Goodman (Harmony, 1957)
 Benny Rides Again (1958)
 Benny Goodman Plays World Favorites in High Fidelity (1958)
 Benny in Brussels Vols. 1 and 2 (Columbia, 1958)
 In Stockholm 1959 (Phontastic, 1959)
 The Benny Goodman Treasure Chest (MGM, 1959)
 The Hits of Benny Goodman (Capital Records, 1961)
 Benny Goodman in Moscow (RCA Victor, 1962)
 Weber Clarinet Concertos Nos. 1 and 2 with the Chicago Symphony (RCA, 1968)
 London Date (Phillips, 1969)
 Benny Goodman Today (London, 1970)
 This Is Benny Goodman (RCA Victor, 1971)
 Benny Goodman – A Legendary Performer (RCA, 1977)
 Benny Goodman Live at Carnegie Hall: 40th Anniversary Concert (1978)
 Benny Goodman – Live in Hamburg 1981 (Stockfisch, 2019)

Posthumous
 Sing, Sing, Sing (Bluebird, 1987)
 The Benny Goodman Sextet Featuring Charlie Christian: 1939–1941
 16 Most Requested Songs (Columbia/Legacy, 1993)
 1935–1938 (1998)
 Carnegie Hall Jazz Concert '38 (1998)
 Bill Dodge All-star Recording (1999)
 1941–1955 His Orchestra and His (1999)
 Live at Carnegie Hall (1999)
 Carnegie Hall: The Complete Concert (2006)
 The Yale University Music Library, Vol. 2: Live at Basin Street (Musical Heritage Society, 1988)
 The Complete RCA Victor Small Group Recordings (RCA Victor, 1997)
 Lausanne 1950 (Swiss Radio Days Theatre De Beaulieu, May 13, 1950 TCB 2005)

See also

The Benny Goodman Story

Notes

References

Bibliography

External links 

 
 Discography of American Historical Recordings as leader
 Discography of American Historical Recordings  as director
 Benny Goodman Audio Collection, Rutgers University
D. Russell Connor collection of Benny Goodman audio recordings, Institute of Jazz Studies
 Audio interview, May 8, 1980, University of Texas at San Antonio
 Benny Goodman papers, Yale University
 Benny Goodman scores, New York Public Library for the Performing Arts
 Biography at RedHotJazz
 Benny Goodman biography with audio
D. Russell Connor collection of Benny Goodman interviews, Gilmore Music Library of Yale University.
 Benny Goodman recordings at the Discography of American Historical Recordings.

 
1909 births
1986 deaths
20th-century American musicians
20th-century clarinetists
American classical clarinetists
American jazz bandleaders
American jazz clarinetists
American people of Lithuanian-Jewish descent
American people of Polish-Jewish descent
American people of Russian-Jewish descent
 
Big band bandleaders
Capitol Records artists
Chess Records artists
Columbia Records artists
RCA Victor artists
Vocalion Records artists
Grammy Lifetime Achievement Award winners
Jazz musicians from Illinois
Jazz musicians from New York (state)
Jewish American classical musicians
Jewish American musicians
Jewish jazz musicians
Kennedy Center honorees
Musicians from Chicago
People from Westchester County, New York
Swing bandleaders
Swing clarinetists
Vaudeville performers
The Charleston Chasers members
Biograph Records artists
Stockfisch Records artists